

The Hanriot HD.28 was a military trainer aircraft developed in France in the 1920s as a modernised version of the HD.14 for export markets. The principal difference between the types was that while the HD.14 had an entirely wooden structure, the HD.28's structure was almost entirely of metal. The landing gear was also of more conventional design, with only one wheel on each main unit, plus small anti-noseover skids. The two tandem cockpits of the HD.14 were replaced by a single, long cockpit in which both pilot and instructor sat.

The aircraft designated as Hanriot H-28 was in fact a Polish-built (at Samolot and CWL), slightly modified version of wooden-construction Hanriot HD.14.

Specifications

See also

References

Bibliography

 
 

1920s French military trainer aircraft
Hanriot aircraft
Single-engined tractor aircraft
Biplanes
Aircraft first flown in 1928